Theddlethorpe is a village in East Lindsey, Lincolnshire, England, that is made up of 2 parishes:

 Theddlethorpe St Helen
 Theddlethorpe All Saints

Theddlethorpe may also refer to Theddlethorpe railway station.